Vinicius Zorin-Machado (born July 12, 1982) is a Brazilian producer and actor. He was born in Rio de Janeiro. He has received a humanitarian award for his philanthropic work and serves as a speaker for stopbullyingnowfoundation.org.

Filmography

External links
 
 Vinicius Machado Interview

References 

Brazilian male actors
1982 births
Living people
Male actors from Rio de Janeiro (city)